United Nations Security Council Resolution 342, adopted unanimously on December 11, 1973, after noting with appreciation a report by the Secretary-General, the Council decided to discontinue further efforts on the basis of resolution 309 and requested the Secretary-General keep them informed of any new developments concerning the question of Namibia.

See also
 History of Namibia
 List of United Nations Security Council Resolutions 301 to 400 (1971–1976)
 South West Africa

References 
Text of the Resolution at undocs.org

External links
 

 0342
 0342
 0342
December 1973 events